Schänis railway station is a railway station in the municipality of Schänis in the Swiss canton of St. Gallen. It is on the Rapperswil to Ziegelbrücke line. It is one of two railway stations in the Gemarkung of Schänis, the other being the much larger Ziegelbrücke railway station at the border to Canton Glarus.

Services 
 Schänis railway station is served by St. Gallen S-Bahn service S4, which operates in both directions around a loop via St. Gallen, Sargans, Ziegelbrücke, and Uznach (reverse of direction), and service S6, which links Rapperswil with Schwanden (or Linthal during off-peak hours) via Uznach and Ziegelbrücke. Both trains run hourly, combining to provide half-hourly services to Uznach and Ziegelbrücke. While the S6 also stops at Benken railway station in the neighboring village of Benken, the S4 does not. Both of these regional train lines are operated by Südostbahn (SOB).

 St. Gallen S-Bahn:

References

External links 
 
 

Railway stations in the canton of St. Gallen
Swiss Federal Railways stations